Verkhny Zayemkuch is a rural locality (a village) in Parfyonovskoye Rural Settlement, Velikoustyugsky District, Vologda Oblast, Russia. The population was 8 as of 2002.

Geography 
Verkhny Zayemkuch is located 19 km south of Veliky Ustyug (the district's administrative centre) by road. Nizhny Zayemkuch is the nearest rural locality.

References 

Rural localities in Velikoustyugsky District